Kévin Coiffic (born 18 September 1994) is a French footballer who plays as a centre-back for Dinan-Léhon FC.

Career
Coiffic played for Lansing Ignite FC in USL League One in 2019. The club ceased operations after their inaugural 2019 season.

References

External links
 
 Profile at Young Harris Athletics

1994 births
Living people
French footballers
French expatriate footballers
Association football defenders
FC Lorient players
FC Miami City players
US Montagnarde players
Lansing Ignite FC players
USL League One players
USL League Two players
Young Harris Mountain Lions men's soccer players
Broward Seahawks men's soccer players
Expatriate soccer players in the United States
French expatriate sportspeople in the United States